Tender may refer to:

Entertainment

Film
 Illegal Tender (2007), a film directed by Franc. Reyes
 Tender (2012), a short film by Liz Tomkins
 Tender (2019), a short film by Darryl Jones and Anthony Lucido
 Tender (2019), a short documentary film by Nicolò Grasso
 Tender (2020), a short film by Felicia Pride

Music
 Tender (album), a 2008 album by Wishbone Ash
 "Tender" (song), by Blur
 Tender (band), a British music duo formed in 2015

Transportation
 Tender (rail), a type of railroad car
 Ship's tender
 Cannery tender
 Destroyer tender
 Lighthouse tender
 Mail tender
 Motor torpedo boat tender
 Seaplane tender
 Water tender, fire truck tanker
 Yacht tender
A term for a light truck, e.g. the 1910s Crossley tender

Other uses
 Legal tender, a form of money with a specific legal status
 Invitation to tender, a structured invitation to vendors for the supply of goods or services
 Procurement, a process of finding and agreeing to terms, and acquiring goods, services, or works from an external source, often via a tendering or competitive bidding process
 Submarine tender, a naval support vessel
 Tender offer, used to propose a buyout of a public company
 Tender (charity), London-based charity that works to prevent domestic and sexual violence
 Chicken tenders, a type of chicken dish
 Tender-mindedness, a personality trait related to agreeability

See also
 Tenderness (disambiguation)